HMS Hibernia is the name given to a shore establishment of the Royal Navy, which serves as the headquarters of the Royal Naval Reserve in Northern Ireland. Commissioned in 2009 to replace the C-class cruiser  as the training establishment for the RNR in Northern Ireland, Hibernia is located as part of Thiepval Barracks in Lisburn, County Antrim. The unit numbers approximately 100 officers and ratings.

References

 

Hibernia